Tshibinda is a group of pyroclastic cones in the east of the Democratic Republic of the Congo. It last erupted during the Pleistocene epoch.

See also
 List of volcanoes in the Democratic Republic of the Congo

References

Volcanoes of the Democratic Republic of the Congo